is a Japanese politician of the Democratic Party of Japan, a member of the House of Councillors in the Diet (national legislature). A native of Osaka, Osaka and high school graduate, he was elected to the House of Councillors for the first time in 2004 after serving in the assembly of Osaka Prefecture for three terms since 1991.

References

External links 
 Official website in Japanese.

Members of the House of Councillors (Japan)
1951 births
Living people
People from Osaka
Democratic Party of Japan politicians